"Beautiful People" is a song recorded by American singer-songwriter Barbara Tucker, who co-wrote it with India, Lem Springsteen and "Little" Louie Vega, who along with partner Kenny "Dope" Gonzalez, co-produced the track. It was released on March 2, 1994, as her first single by Strictly Rhythm Records, and was also Tucker's first of seven number-one singles on the US Billboard Hot Dance Club Play chart, reaching the top spot on April 16, 1994. On the UK Singles Chart, it peaked at number 23, while it topped both the UK Dance Singles Chart and the UK Club Chart.

Mixmag featured "Beautiful People" in their list of "The 30 Best Vocal House Anthems Ever" in 2018, and Pitchfork featured it in their list of "The 30 Best House Tracks of the ’90s" in 2022.

Critical reception
Larry Flick from Billboard felt "Beautiful People" had Tucker "flexing her gospel-honed voice to maximum effect. Factor in crafty production by "Little" Louie Vega that carefully balanced assertive beats with a wicked hook, and you had an unstoppable star vehicle." He also declared it as an "instantly memorable house anthem". British electronic dance and clubbing magazine Mixmag called it "a wonderfully crafted track. The fleet-fingered organ line and snares that hit like hand claps give it a rapturous gospel feel, packing the production full of soul. And Barabara Tucker takes this feeling to another level with her peerless vocal turn. She’s one of the most deified voices in house music and ‘Beautiful People’ is a shining example as to why." 

Maria Jimenez from Music & Media described it as "seriously smooth" and "a delicious garagey house number with a massaging bass, smooth rhythm and on target vocals." Andy Beevers from Music Week gave it five out of five, complimenting it as a "superb New York garage track". He stated that the singer "really does justice to the excellent uplifting lyrics." James Hamilton from the RM Dance Update declared it as a "superb breezily attractive gospel-ish romper".

Impact and legacy
British clubbing magazine Mixmag ranked "Beautiful People" as one of "The 30 Best Vocal House Anthems Ever" in 2018. 

In 2022, Pitchfork featured it in their list of "The 30 Best House Tracks of the ’90s", writing that "Tucker's sassy, yearning delivery rides a wave of jazzy chord changes, exquisite high notes, and back-to-church organs. She's got one of the most recognizable voices in house music: Its soulful tones, immaculate control, and hint of unspecified naughtiness are enough to draw the most introverted wallflower onto the floor."

Track listing
 CD maxi (US)
"Beautiful People" (Radio Edit) – 4:06
"Beautiful People" (Underground Network Mix) – 9:08 
"Beautiful People" (Beautiful Reprise) – 5:41
"Beautiful People" (CJ's Club Mix) – 7:38
"Beautiful People" (CJ's Dub) – 8:08
"Beautiful People" (Original Club Mix) – 9:28
"Beautiful People" (CJ's Instrumental) – 8:08
"Beautiful People" (Mood II Swing Dub) – 5:26

Charts

References

External links
Official video on YouTube

1994 songs
1994 debut singles
Barbara Tucker songs
American house music songs
House music songs
Music Week number-one dance singles
Positiva Records singles
Strictly Rhythm singles